Gorla is a surname. People with the surname include:

 Giorgio Gorla (born 1944), Italian sailor
 Giuseppe Gorla (1895–1970), Italian engineer and politician
 Marquise-Thérèse de Gorla (1633–1668), French actress and ballerina

See also
 Gorla (disambiguation)

Italian-language surnames